Waioeka is a rural community in the Ōpōtiki District and Bay of Plenty Region of New Zealand's North Island. It is on the east bank of the Waioeka River.

Demographics

Oponae had a population of 330 at the 2018 New Zealand census, an increase of 36 people (12.2%) since the 2013 census, and an increase of 30 people (10.0%) since the 2006 census. There were 93 households, comprising 165 males and 168 females, giving a sex ratio of 0.98 males per female. The median age was 35.1 years (compared with 37.4 years nationally), with 90 people (27.3%) aged under 15 years, 57 (17.3%) aged 15 to 29, 144 (43.6%) aged 30 to 64, and 39 (11.8%) aged 65 or older.

Ethnicities were 49.1% European/Pākehā, 60.0% Māori, 2.7% Pacific peoples, 0.9% Asian, and 0.9% other ethnicities. People may identify with more than one ethnicity.

The percentage of people born overseas was 7.3, compared with 27.1% nationally.

Although some people chose not to answer the census's question about religious affiliation, 34.5% had no religion, 28.2% were Christian, and 28.2% had Māori religious beliefs.

Of those at least 15 years old, 30 (12.5%) people had a bachelor's or higher degree, and 69 (28.8%) people had no formal qualifications. The median income was $19,900, compared with $31,800 nationally. 12 people (5.0%) earned over $70,000 compared to 17.2% nationally. The employment status of those at least 15 was that 90 (37.5%) people were employed full-time, 42 (17.5%) were part-time, and 24 (10.0%) were unemployed.

Marae

The local marae is known variously as Ōpeke Marae, Opekerau Marae or Waioeka Marae. It is the traditional tribal meeting place of the Whakatōhea hapū Ngāti Irapuaia / Ngāti Ira. The meeting house is called Irapuaia.

Waioeka was the location of Tanewhirinaki, at the time one of the largest wharenui ever built. The structure, which was built by Te Kooti for his followers, was completed in the late 1860s.

Education

References

Ōpōtiki District
Populated places in the Bay of Plenty Region